Viisimaa is an Estonian surname. Notable people with the surname include:

Aarne Viisimaa (1898–1989), Estonian operatic tenor and opera director
Vello Viisimaa (1928–1991), Estonian singer and actor, son of Aarne

Estonian-language surnames